Sport 890 is a Uruguayan Spanish-language AM radio station that broadcasts from Montevideo, Uruguay. Sport 890 broadcasts a sports radio format.

References

External links
 
 890 AM

Spanish-language radio stations
Radio in Uruguay
Sport in Uruguay
Sports radio stations
Mass media in Montevideo